Hiệp Phước is a township of Nhơn Trạch District, Đồng Nai Province, Vietnam.

References

Populated places in Đồng Nai province
Communes of Đồng Nai province
Townships in Vietnam